Tejn Church is located at Tejn on the north-east coast of the Danish island of Bornholm. The most recent of the island's churches, it was built in 1940 to a Functionalist design by Emanuel Grauslund (1901-1951). It is a simple, whitewashed building on a granite base with rectangular, small-paned windows and a red-tiled roof.

Inside, the distinctive font consists of loosely connected granite blocks. The organ from 1980 was built by Finn Krohn.

See also
List of churches on Bornholm

References

Churches in Bornholm
Churches completed in 1940
Functionalist architecture